Dnopolje is a village in Croatia. It is connected by the D218 highway.

Population

According to the 2011 census, Dnopolje had 112 inhabitants.

Note: From 1857-1880 include data for the settlement of Birovača, and also part of data for the settlement of Mišljenovac.

1991 census 

According to the 1991 census, settlement of Dnopolje had 249 inhabitants, which were ethnically declared as this:

Austro-hungarian 1910 census 

According to the 1910 census, settlement of Dnopolje had 809 inhabitants in 2 hamlets, which were linguistically and religiously declared as this:

Literature 

  Savezni zavod za statistiku i evidenciju FNRJ i SFRJ, popis stanovništva 1948, 1953, 1961, 1971, 1981. i 1991. godine.
 Knjiga: "Narodnosni i vjerski sastav stanovništva Hrvatske, 1880-1991: po naseljima, autor: Jakov Gelo, izdavač: Državni zavod za statistiku Republike Hrvatske, 1998., ;

References

Populated places in Lika-Senj County
Serb communities in Croatia